Axel Alarik Pehrsson-Bramstorp (born Axel Alarik Pehrsson; 19 August 1883 – 19 February 1954) was a Swedish politician and was Prime Minister of Sweden for a few months during 1936. As a parliamentarian he was known as Axel Pehrsson in Bramstorp, or just Bramstorp for short. In 1937 he officially added the name of his farm to his family name.

Early life
Axel Pehrsson was a member of a farming family in Öja (now in Ystad Municipality) in Skåne. His father's death made it impossible for him to continue his schooling. After the age of 14, he later completed some adult education courses in a folkhögskola (the equivalent of community college). His parents' farm was of considerable size. At the time of his marriage he bought Bramstorp farm in the same parish and later took over the parental farm and bought several others as well.

Political career
Pehrsson was active in local and regional politics, and in 1918 became a Member of the Second Chamber of the Riksdag, representing the Liberal Party, but he was not re-elected in 1921. He switched to the Agrarian Party Bondeförbundet (the "Farmers' League") and was elected a Member of the Second Chamber in 1929, where he served until 1949. He was chairman of the party from 1934 to 1949.

After the Social Democratic cabinet of Per Albin Hansson was overthrown by a parliamentary majority in spring 1936, Pehrsson got the mandate of King Gustaf V to form a non-socialist coalition government. This turned out to be impossible and Pehrsson briefly headed a one-party cabinet as prime minister from 19 June to 28 September 1936. Since this cabinet was only in office during the summer it was called "The Holiday Government". He appointed himself Minister of Agriculture; after the elections to the Second Chamber in September he resigned as Prime Minister but remained as Minister of Agriculture in the new Hansson cabinet, which was a coalition of Social Democrats and the Agrarian Party. He continued in the same cabinet position in the national coalition cabinet which was formed under Hansson's prime ministership at the outbreak of World War II in 1939 and sat until the end of the war in 1945.

Later activities
After the resignation of the war-time coalition cabinet, Pehrsson-Bramstorp held various important positions in agricultural organisations, while remaining chairman of his party and a member of parliament, until illness forced him to retire in 1949. He was awarded a knighthood of the Order of the Seraphim the same year, and lived the rest of his life on his farm.

References 

1883 births
1954 deaths
Members of the Andra kammaren
Prime Ministers of Sweden
Members of the Riksdag from the Centre Party (Sweden)
Swedish Ministers for Agriculture
Leaders of political parties in Sweden
Great Depression in Sweden
People from Ystad